Enrica Bianchi Colombatto (born 23 July 1942), usually known by her stagename of Erika Blanc, is an Italian actress.

Career
Her most notable role was as the first fictional character Emmanuelle in Io, Emmanuelle (1969).  Blanc starred in several cult European horror films, including The Third Eye (1966), Kill, Baby, Kill (1966),  So Sweet... So Perverse (1969), The Night Evelyn Came Out of the Grave (1971), The Devil's Nightmare (1971), The Red Headed Corpse (1972) and Mark of the Devil Part II (1973).

Her other film credits include roles in Django Shoots First (1966), Long Arm of the Godfather (1972), Tony Arzenta (1973), The Stranger and the Gunfighter (1974), Eye of the Cat (1976) and Dream of a Summer Night (1983).

She recently returned to films with small but intense roles under the direction of Turkish-born director Ferzan Özpetek, acting as Antonia's mother in Le fate ignoranti (2001), and as the sensitive, alcohol-addicted Maria Clara in Cuore Sacro (2005). In 2003 she starred as the grandmother in Adored, directed by Marco Filiberti.

Selected filmography

Agent 077: Mission Bloody Mary (1965)
Operation Atlantis (1965)
Lady Morgan's Revenge (1965)
Django Shoots First (1966)
Target Goldseven (1966)
Blood at Sundown (1966)
The Third Eye (1966)
Spies Strike Silently (1966)
Kill, Baby, Kill (1966)
Last Man to Kill (1966)
Blood at Sundown (1966)
El hombre del puño de oro (1967)
Halleluja for Django (1967)
Tom Dollar (1967)
The Longest Hunt (1968)
Seven Times Seven (1968)
The Magnificent Tony Carrera (1968)
Hell in Normandy (1968)
 So Sweet... So Perverse (1969)
Io, Emmanuelle (1969)
Con quale amore, con quanto amore (1970)
Stagecoach of the Condemned (1970)
Sartana's Here… Trade Your Pistol for a Coffin (1970)
La casa delle mele mature (1971)
Human Cobras (1971)
The Night Evelyn Came Out of the Grave (1971)
The Devil's Nightmare (1971)

The Red Headed Corpse (1972)
Long Arm of the Godfather (1972)
Love and Death in the Garden of the Gods (1972)
The Godfather's Friend (1972)
Mark of the Devil Part II (1973)
Bella, ricca, lieve difetto fisico, cerca anima gemella (1973)
Giorni d'amore sul filo di una lama (1973)
Tony Arzenta (1973)
Primo tango a Roma - Storia d'amore e d'alchimia (1973)
Bruna, formosa, cerca superdotato (1973)
The Stranger and the Gunfighter (1974)
Il domestico (1974)
I figli di nessuno (1974)
Bello come un arcangelo (1974)
Una libélula para cada muerto (1975)
Giochi erotici di una famiglia per bene (1975)
Eye of the Cat (1976)
La portiera nuda (1976)
The Mistress Is Served (1976)
Carcerato (1981)
Dream of a Summer Night (1983)
Body Puzzle (1992)
Le fate ignoranti (2001)
Adored (2003)
Cuore Sacro (2005)
A Second Childhood (2010)
The Big Heart of Girls (2011)

References

External links

1942 births
Italian film actresses
Living people
Actors from Brescia
Spaghetti Western actresses
20th-century Italian actresses
21st-century Italian actresses